Quod Libet is a cross-platform free and open-source audio player, tag editor and library organizer. The main design philosophy is that the user knows how they want to organize their music best; the software is therefore built to be fully customizable and extensible using regular expressions and boolean logic. Quod Libet is based on GTK and written in Python, and uses the Mutagen tagging library. Ex Falso is the stand-alone tag-editing app (no audio) based on the same code and libraries.

Quod Libet is very scalable, able to handle libraries with tens of thousands of songs with ease. It provides a full feature set including support for Unicode, regular expression searching, key bindings to multimedia keys, fast but powerful tag editing, and a variety of plugins.

Quod Libet is available on most Linux distributions, macOS and Windows, requiring only PyGObject, Python, and an Open Sound System (OSS), ALSA or JACK compatible audio device. The XFCE desktop ISO image provided by the Debian project installs Quod Libet as the default audio player.

Features

Audio playback
 Can deal with various audio back-ends via the plug-in architecture of GStreamer
 Supports ReplayGain with smart selection based on either single track or full album, based on current view and play order
 'Real' shuffle mode- entire playlist played before repeating
 Ratings weighted random playback setting
 Configurable play queue

Tag editing
 Complete Unicode support
 Changes to multiple files at once, even if files are in different formats
 Ability to tag files based on filenames with fully configurable formats
 Customizable renaming of files based on their tags and a user-supplied format
 Human readable tag references, e.g. <artist> or <title> rather than %a or %t, with support for "if not-null x else y" logic (e.g. <albumartist|albumartist|artist>)
 Fast track renumbering

Audio library
 Audio Feeds / Podcast support
 Authenticated SoundCloud support 
 Can save play counts
 Can download and save lyrics
 Fast refreshing of entire library based on changed files
 Internet Radio / SHOUTcast support
 Configurable song rating

User interface

 Configurable interface to suit user preferences; Pango markup is used so that user can display tags in any way desired in the player
 Launch additional "browsers" to keep different or multiple views on the library 
 Drag-n-drop support throughout interface.
 Tray icon with full player control
 Automatically recognize and display tags from many uncommon tags
 Customisable Aggregation across albums or playlists (min, max, average, sum, Bayesian average)
 Multiple ways to browse library:
 Progressive search - library is filtered as searches are typed
 Queries support boolean logic, numerical / date-based expressions, and regular expressions, and synthetic tags, that are derived internally (e.g. play count, rating, inclusion in playlist).
 Playlists with integration throughout the player
 Paned browser, using any fully customizable tags (e.g. genre, date, album artist...), allowing the user to [drill down] through their library as they prefer
 View by album list with cover art
 View by file-system directory, which includes songs not in your library

File formats
Include MP3, Ogg Vorbis, Opus, FLAC, ALAC, Musepack, MOD/XM/IT, WMA, Wavpack, MPEG-4 AAC

Unix-like control and query mechanisms
 Status information available from the command line
 Control of player using named pipe (FIFO) is possible
 Text-based files available with current song information

Plugins
Quod Libet is currently bundled with over 80 Python-based plugins, including:
 Automatic tagging via MusicBrainz and CDDB
 Download and preview album art from a variety of online sources
 On-screen display pop-ups
 Last.fm/AudioScrobbler submission
 Tag character encoding conversion
 Intelligent title-casing of tags
 Finding duplicate or near-duplicate songs across the entire library
 Scan and save Replay Gain values across multiple albums at once (using GStreamer)
 D-Bus-based Multimedia Shortcut Keys
 Integrate with Sonos systems and Logitech Squeezebox
 Export playlists to common formats (PLS, M3U, XSPF)
 Publish to MQTT queues

See also

 Comparison of free software for audio#Players
 Exaile
 DeaDBeeF

References

External links
 
 
 Quod Libet on Bitbucket
 Debian Package information page

2004 software
Applications using D-Bus
Audio software with JACK support
Audio player software that uses GTK
Cross-platform free software
Free audio software
Free media players
Free software programmed in Python
Linux media players
MacOS multimedia software
Software that uses PyGObject
Tag editors for Linux
Windows multimedia software